Joaquim Moutinho da Silva Santos (14 December 1951 – 22 November 2019) was a Portuguese rally driver, who in 1986 won the Rally de Portugal, a round of the World Rally Championship. Moutinho, who was born in Porto, was also a champion in the Portuguese Touring Car Championship and Portuguese Rally Championship.

Career
Moutinho participated mainly in the Portuguese Rally Championship, which he won in 1985 and 1986 in a Renault 5 Turbo. He took part in the Rally de Portugal nine times between 1973 and 1986. He finished ninth in 1981 in an Opel Kadett GT/E. Moutinho won the 1986 event following the accident of compatriot Joaquim Santos that killed three spectators. All of the factory teams withdrew from the event, allowing Moutinho to win the rally. It would be his final WRC event.

Moutinho also competed regularly in the Portuguese Touring Car Championship (CNV). He missed out on fighting for the title in 1980 due to repeated mechanical failures, but won the B2 class in 1981 in a heavily modified Group 5 Porsche 911.

WRC victories
{|class="wikitable"
! # 
!Event
!Season
!Co-driver
!Car
|-
|1
| 20º Rallye de Portugal Vinho do Porto
|1986
|Edgar Fortes
|Renault 5 Turbo
|}

References

External links
Profile at World Rally Archive
Profile at RallyBase

1951 births
2019 deaths
Sportspeople from Porto
Portuguese rally drivers
World Rally Championship drivers